The 2003 NCAA Division I softball tournament was the twenty-second annual tournament to determine the national champion of NCAA women's collegiate softball. Held during May 2003, sixty-four Division I college softball teams contested the championship. The tournament featured eight regionals of eight teams, each in a double elimination format. The 2003 Women's College World Series was held in Oklahoma City, Oklahoma from May 22 through May 25 and marked the conclusion of the 2003 NCAA Division I softball season.  UCLA won their tenth NCAA championship and eleventh overall by defeating  1–0 in the final game.  UCLA pitcher Keira Goerl was named Women's College World Series Most Outstanding Player.

Qualifying

Regionals

Regional No. 1
Opening Round

Regional No. 2

Regional No. 3

Regional No. 4

Regional No. 5

Regional No. 6
{{8Team2ElimBracket|RD5-legs=2

| RD1-seed1=
| RD1-team1=
| RD1-score1=6
| RD1-seed2=
| RD1-team2=
| RD1-score2=0

| RD1-seed3=
| RD1-team3=
| RD1-score3=3
| RD1-seed4=
| RD1-team4=
| RD1-score4=0

| RD1-seed5=
| RD1-team5=
| RD1-score5=10
| RD1-seed6=
| RD1-team6=
| RD1-score6=8

| RD1-seed7=
| RD1-team7=
| RD1-score7=1
| RD1-seed8=
| RD1-team8=
| RD1-score8=0

| RD2-seed1=
| RD2-team1=
| RD2-score1=1
| RD2-seed2=
| RD2-team2=Cal State Fullerton
| RD2-score2=0

| RD2-seed3=
| RD2-team3=Oregon
| RD2-score3=1
| RD2-seed4=
| RD2-team4=Oklahoma State
| RD2-score4=2

| RD3-seed1=
| RD3-team1=
| RD3-score1=1
| RD3-seed2=
| RD3-team2=Oklahoma State
| RD3-score2=0

| RD1-seed9=
| RD1-team9=San Diego State
| RD1-score9=2
| RD1-seed10=
| RD1-team10=Rider
| RD1-score10=1

| RD1-seed11=
| RD1-team11=Penn State
| RD1-score11=7
| RD1-seed12=
| RD1-team12=Boston University
| RD1-score12=0

| RD2-seed5=
| RD2-team5=Oregon
| RD2-score5=4
| RD2-seed6=
| RD2-team6=San Diego State
| RD2-score6=1

| RD2-seed7=
| RD2-team7=Cal State Fullerton
| RD2-score7=86
| RD2-seed8=
| RD2-team8=Penn State
| RD2-score8=0

| RD3-seed3=
| RD3-team3=Oregon
| RD3-score3=2
| RD3-seed4=
| RD3-team4=Cal State Fullerton
| RD3-score4=1

| RD4-seed1=
| RD4-team1=Oklahoma State
| RD4-score1=6| RD4-seed2=
| RD4-team2=Oregon| RD4-score2=712

| RD5-seed1=
| RD5-team1=| RD5-score1a=2
| RD5-score1b=6| RD5-seed2=
| RD5-team2=Oregon
| RD5-score2a=9| RD5-score2b=4
}}

Regional No. 7

Regional No. 8

Women's College World Series

 Participants *: Excludes UCLA's vacated 1995 WCWS participation.†''': Excludes results of the pre-NCAA Women's College World Series of 1969 through 1981.

Bracket

Game results

Championship game

All-Tournament Team
The following players were members of the All-Tournament Team:

Notes

References

2003 NCAA Division I softball season
NCAA Division I softball tournament